Events from the year 1861 in Sweden

Incumbents
 Monarch – Charles XV

Events
 A decision is taken to construct Strandvägen in Stockholm.
 The inauguration of the women teachers' training college Högre lärarinneseminariet, the first institution of higher learning open to women in Sweden.
 The dentist profession is opened to women.
 Danviken Hospital is closed.
 March - The king grants the con artist Helga de la Brache an annual pension from the foreign department of 2,400 Swedish riksdaler a year, (the amount, from the beginning 1.200, was made larger in December 1869).

Births
 5 January - Anna Pettersson, lawyer (died 1929)
 2 June - Concordia Selander, actress and theater manager (died 1935) 
 24 April - Hedda Andersson, second female doctor in Sweden  (died 1950)
 14 May - Valborg Olander, politician  (died 1943)
 29 October - Karolina Olsson, hibernator  (died 1950)
 11 November - Elsa Eschelsson, first female doctor of Laws  (died 1911)

Deaths

 17 January - Malla Silfverstolpe, salonnière  (born 1782)
 21 February - Lars Levi Læstadius

References

 
Years of the 19th century in Sweden
Sweden